Hemp oil (hemp seed oil) is oil obtained by pressing hemp seeds. Cold pressed, unrefined hemp oil is dark to clear light green in color, with a nutty flavor. The darker the color, the grassier the flavour. It should not be confused with hash oil, a tetrahydrocannabinol-containing oil made from the Cannabis flower.

Description 
Refined hemp seed oil is clear and colorless, with little flavor. It is primarily used in body care products. Industrial hemp seed oil is used in lubricants, paints, inks, fuel, and plastics. Hemp seed oil is used in the production of soaps, shampoos and detergents. The oil has a 3:1 ratio of omega-6 to omega-3 essential fatty acids. It may also be used as a feedstock for the large-scale production of biodiesel.

Manufacture 
Hemp seed oil is manufactured from varieties of Cannabis sativa that do not contain significant amounts of tetrahydrocannabinol (THC), the principal psychoactive element present in the cannabis plant. This manufacturing process typically includes cleaning the seed to 99.99% before pressing the oil. There is no THC within the hemp seed, although trace amounts of THC may be found in hemp seed oil when plant matter adheres to the seed surface during manufacturing. The modern production of hemp seed oil, particularly in Canada, has successfully lowered THC values since 1998. Regular accredited sampling of THC in Canadian hemp seed oil shows THC levels usually below detection limit of 4 ppm (parts per million, or 4 mg/kg). Legal limit for THC content in foodstuffs in Canada is 10 ppm. Some European countries have limits of 5 ppm or none-detected, some EU countries do not have such limits at all.

Nutrition

About 49% of the weight of hempseed is an edible oil that contains 76% as polyunsaturated fat, including omega-6 fatty acids such as linoleic acid (LA, 54%) and gamma-linolenic acid (GLA, 3%), and omega-3 fatty acids such as alpha-linolenic acid (ALA, 17%) and stearidonic acid (2%). Both LA and ALA are essential fatty acids. In addition, hempseed oil contains 5% to 11% monounsaturated fat and 5% to 7% saturated fat. In common with other oils and fats, hemp seed oil provides 9 kcal/g.

Compared with other culinary oils, hempseed oil is low in saturated fat and rich in polyunsaturated fat. It has a relatively low smoke point and is not suitable for frying. It is primarily used as a food oil and dietary supplement.

Comparison to other vegetable oils

Wood finish
Hemp oil is a "drying oil", as it can polymerize into a solid form. Due to its polymer-forming properties, hemp oil is used on its own or blended with other oils, resins, and solvents as an impregnator and varnish in wood finishing, as a pigment binder in oil paints, and as a plasticizer and hardener in putty.

Gallery

Society and culture
In December 2021, Berlin's public transport offered passengers edible hemp tickets.

See also

 Cannabis (drug)
 Cannabis flower essential oil
 Finola (hemp)
 Hemp plastic
 Vegetable oil

References

Oil
Vegetable oils